The Barstow Freeway is one of the named principal Southern California freeways. It consists of the following segments:

Interstate 215, from California State Route 210 to Interstate 15 in San Bernardino
Interstate 15, from Interstate 215 to the Nevada state line
Note: The I-15 portion of the Barstow Freeway up to the Nevada state line is also designated as the Mojave Freeway

Southern California freeways
Named freeways in California
Interstate 15
Roads in San Bernardino County, California